The  or  (Dutch), meaning "New Street", is a pedestrian street in central Brussels, Belgium. It runs between the Place de la Monnaie/Muntplein to the south and the Place Charles Rogier/Karel Rogierplein to the north.

The Rue Neuve and its close surroundings are the second most popular shopping area in Belgium by number of shoppers, after Meir in Antwerp. It is served by the metro and premetro (underground tram) stations De Brouckère (on lines 1, 3, 4 and 5) and Rogier (on lines 2, 3, 4 and 6).

History
The street used to be called the /, after the Church of Our Lady of Finistere, which is now in the middle of the retail district. It has been a centre of commercial activity since at least the end of the 19th century, and was known as a centre of luxury shopping in the early 20th century. The street was pedestrianised in 1975.

Nowadays, the Rue Neuve has the second highest rents of any street in Belgium, at €1,600/square metre/year (the Meir shopping street in Antwerp ranks first, with €1,700/square metre/year). However, it has been criticised by some for being too "boring" architecturally, uniformly "mass market", lacking in independent retailers, without variety of uses, and with very few residents. The City of Brussels has plans to bring more residents to the street and to make it more "attractive".

See also

 List of streets in Brussels
 History of Brussels
 Belgium in "the long nineteenth century"

References

Notes

Neuve
City of Brussels
19th century in Brussels
Shopping districts and streets in Belgium
Pedestrian malls in Belgium
Car-free zones in Europe